Ekeroma Tifaga Luaiufi, also spelled Lauaiufi (born July 8, 1963), is a former Samoan rugby union player, who also played for Japan. He played as a lock.

Career
He started to play for Samoa during a test match against Fiji, at Suva, on August 22, 1987. His last match for Samoa was during a test match against Fiji, at Apia, on June 4, 1988. Two years later, Luaiufi started to play for Japan in the match against Fiji, at Tokyo, on March 4, 1990. He was part of the Japan team at 1991 Rugby World Cup, where he played three matches and scored a try in the match against Zimbabwe, at Belfast, on October 14. He retired after the World Cup. In his club career, he played for Canterbury in New Zealand and for NikoNikoDo, a team managed by Youme Mart, based in Kumamoto in Japan.

Notes

References
Ekeroma Luaiufi International Statistics
E. Luaiufi at New Zealand Rugby History

1963 births
Living people
Samoan rugby union players
Japanese rugby union players
Samoan emigrants to Japan
Naturalized citizens of Japan
Japan international rugby union players
Samoan expatriate rugby union players
Expatriate rugby union players in New Zealand
Expatriate rugby union players in Japan
Samoan expatriate sportspeople in Japan
Samoa international rugby union players
Rugby union locks